Rónán McGregor (born 1983) is an Irish former hurler. At club level he played with Na Piarsaigh and was also a member of the Cork senior hurling team. McGregor usually lined out in defence or at midfield.

Career

McGregor first came to hurling prominence at juvenile and underage levels with Na Piarsaigh. He simultaneously lined out with the North Monastery in the Harty Cup before progressing onto the Na Piarsaigh senior team. He won a Cork SHC title in 2004 after beating Cloyne in the final. McGregor also represented University College Cork in the Fitzgibbon Cup competition and was eventually noticed by inter-county selectors. He was included on the Cork under-21 hurling team in 2004 before earning inclusion on the senior team the following year. McGregor made a number of the National League appearances and was an unused substitute when Cork beat Galway in the 2005 All-Ireland final. He was released from the Cork panel in February 2006.

Career statistics

Honours

Na Piarsaigh
Cork Senior Hurling Championship: 2004

Cork
All-Ireland Senior Hurling Championship: 2005
Munster Senior Hurling Championship: 2005

References

2001 births
Living people
UCC hurlers
Na Piarsaigh hurlers
Cork inter-county hurlers